Chex Mix (stylized as Chex mix) is a type of snack mix that includes Chex breakfast cereal (sold by General Mills) as a major component.

There are many recipes (often printed on Chex cereal boxes) for homemade Chex Mix, also known as Chex Party Mix, which predates the commercial version by thirty-odd years. Though contents vary, the mixes generally include an assortment of Chex cereals, chips, hard breadsticks, pretzels, nuts or bagel bites. There are also  commercially sold pre-made varieties of Chex Mix sold by the maker of Chex Cereals.

History of Chex Party Mix
Wheat Chex cereal was introduced in 1937 and Rice Chex in 1950 by Ralston Purina. 

In 1952 an advertisement for Chex party mix appeared in Life Magazine with a recipe that included Wheat and Rice Chex. 

In 1958 Corn Chex was introduced and added to the recipe. However, it was not until 1985 that pre-packaged products were introduced commercially by Ralston Purina and the trademarks registered to it.

"Original Chex Party Mix"
This refers to the official recipe on the box of chex cereal.
The recipe for the "Original chex party mix" has changed multiple times over the years. There are recipes from 1960s, 1970s and 1980's  that differ from the current "Original Chex Party Mix"

Advertising
In the late 1980s and early 1990s, Charlie Brown and the "Peanuts" gang were used in animated TV commercials to promote Chex Party mix. In August 1996, General Mills acquired the Chex product line from Ralston Purina along with other brands.

Homemade Chex Mix
There are a number of recipes for homemade Chex mix including recipes on the Chex cereal boxes.

Commercial contents and varieties
All commercial Chex Mixes contain some form of Chex cereal. Other ingredients generally include rye chips, bagel chips, breadsticks, pretzels, nuts, and crackers. In total, General Mills produces 13 varieties of Chex Mixes, not including limited editions. These flavors can be broadly divided into three categories: salty, chocolate (usually marketed as "Muddy Buddies"), and sweet 'n salty. Sometimes, limited edition varieties of Chex Mix are released.  Past examples of these include Winter Chex Mix Cocoa and Summer Chex Mix Ranch.  In 2009, two new flavors, Spicy Szechuan, and Teriyaki were introduced and made available exclusively at convenience stores.

Savory
 Traditional
 Cheddar
 Buffalo Ranch
 Spicy Dill
 Bold Party Blend
 Sour Cream & Onion
 Peanut Lover's
 Hot 'n Spicy 
 Jalapeño Cheddar
 Chipotle Cheddar
 White Cheddar
 Soul Food
 Italian Herb & Parmesan
 Cherry & Crunchy Nuts
 Extreme Sweet and Spicy Sriracha
 Extreme Habanero
 Ghost Pepper
 Honey BBQ
 Strawberry and Cranberry Walnut
 Sauerkraut
 Nacho Fiesta (discontinued)

Sweet 'n salty
 Caramel Crunch
 Honey Nut
 Trail Mix
 Malted Mix

Sweet
 Turtle Shell
 Dark Chocolate
 Peanut Butter Chocolate 
 Brownie Supreme 
 Snicker doodle
 Cookies & Cream
 Fruity Pebbles

See also

 Bombay Mix
 Gardetto's
 List of brand name snack foods
 Munchies

References

External links

 Chex Homepage
 Original Chex party mix recipe from Life magazine, June 1952.

Brand name snack foods
General Mills brands
Chex
Products introduced in 1985